The Bauer Automatic is an American-made copy of the Baby Browning.  Made of stainless steel, they are chambered in .25 ACP with a six-round capacity detachable box magazine. The Bauer was manufactured in Fraser, Michigan from 1972–1984. The pistol was marketed as the Fraser-25 from 1984 to 1986.

Features
The Bauer .25 Automatic was made of precision machined 416 stainless steel investment castings and fitted by hand.  The pistol features a two-position thumb safety. One position locks the slide while the other position locks the slide in the disassembly position, allowing the user to rotate the barrel clock-wise 45 degrees and remove the entire slide (rather than counterclockwise-as is the case with the FN Baby Browning pistol, to avoid copyright infringement claims from FN).

Factory options included "white pearl" (plastic) or wood grips, and a variety of holsters. An engraved version was manufactured for the Bicentennial in 1976.

Many parts interchange with the FN Baby Browning, including grips, magazines, and various internal parts.

References

External links
 Owner's Manual

.25 ACP semi-automatic pistols